Winchfield is a small village in the Hart District of Hampshire in the South-East of England. It is connected to London Waterloo and Basingstoke by the South West Main Line.

Winchfield consists of a recently rebuilt village hall (in 1998), a church, a 17th-century inn called the Winchfield Inn and a combination of old residential properties and new ones.

Winchfield parish currently has a population of 581 people, which was projected to rise to just over 600 in 2008. The population is scattered across this wide parish, which includes Potbridge, settlement around Winchfield church, Winchfield Hurst and Shapley Heath.

History
There was a Stone Age settlement at Bagwell Green, a few hundred yards past the church in the direction of Odiham Common. Winchfield also has a few examples of 16th- and 17th-century buildings, particularly near the church.

Winchfield's manor was mentioned in the Domesday Book of 1088. In 1838, a station was constructed, known as Shapley Heath and was renamed Winchfield Station, probably in 1840, although the exact date for this is unknown. Between 1838 and 1839, Shapley Heath station served as the terminus point for all rail services from London. From here, all mail was then distributed to the rest of the South of England by mail coach. This continued for about a year, when the railway was extended to Basingstoke late in 1839..

Notably, there was also a large workhouse located in Pale Lane which then became a hospital and has since been the subject of redevelopment into a housing development.

The parish council was formed in 1894, and since then, the village has continued to slowly expand, with newer properties constructed at Winchfield Hurst and near the Station.

Notable buildings

St Mary the Virgin
St Mary the Virgin was built during the 12th century. The church has been hardly altered since its original construction in the 12th century, with the exception of the sixteenth-century south porch and a modern north aisle and top stage of the tower.

The Old School House

The Old School was built in 1860–61 by William Burges.  The building is of brick, in the gothic style, with a patterned tiled roof.  Its most striking feature is the pair of "full height windows with open timberwork gables marking the former schoolroom."  Following alteration, the school is now a private residence.

Winchfield Festival
Winchfield holds a biennial festival, which is centred on Winchfield's 12th-century church. The festival developed from a single musical event initiated sixteen years ago to raise funds to renovate the church organ. Since then the festival has expanded with the help of the local community to include both fun and educational events. The Winchfield Festival is a properly constituted charity, with educational as well as entertainment goals.

During the 2006 festival, the festival had jazz performances, a male voice choir, easy classics and the Gould Piano Trio, as well as some classical soloists such as Tasmin Little, John Lenehan and Llŷr Williams.

Proposed new development at Winchfield
On 27 November 2014, Hart District Council voted  to test Winchfield as a suitable location for a new settlement of up to 10,000 homes.

Notable people
Arthur Wood (1875–1961), Royal Navy rear admiral and first-class cricketer

Notes

References

External links
Winchfield - Hart District Council Website
Winchfield Parish's Official Website 
St Mary's Winchfield Website
Winchfield Action Group

Villages in Hampshire
William Burges buildings